Michael Adams (born January 19, 1963) is an American former professional basketball player and coach. Adams was born in Hartford, Connecticut.

Professional career
After starring at Boston College, the 5'10" point guard was selected by the Sacramento Kings in the 3rd round with the 66th pick of the 1985 NBA Draft.  He averaged only 2.2 points during his rookie season, but he had more success later in his career while playing for other teams. In his second season, he played with the Washington Bullets, but Adams had his best season in 1990-1991, when he averaged 26.5 points (including a 54-point game in which made a career-high 9 3-pointers) and 10.5 assists per game while playing for the Denver Nuggets. After that breakout season, he rejoined the Bullets via a trade, during which time he appeared in his only NBA All-Star Game in 1992. In his first game back with the Bullets, he recorded a career-high 9 steals to go along with 23 points and 13 assists in a 109-103 win over the Indiana Pacers.

Renowned for his "push shot," Adams retired in 1996 when playing for the Charlotte Hornets with NBA career totals of 9,621 points and 4,209 assists, and was once among the all-time league leaders in three-point field goals made and attempted. Adams had a record 79 consecutive games with a 3-point field goal (January 28, 1988 – January 23, 1989). The record is now held by Stephen Curry.

Coaching career
Adams has held coaching positions with the International Basketball League's Richmond Rhythm, the NBA's Vancouver Grizzlies, the WNBA's Washington Mystics, and the University of Maryland.

NBA career statistics

Regular season

|-
| align="left" | 1985–86
| align="left" | Sacramento
| 18 || 0 || 7.7 || .364 || .000 || .667 || .3 || 1.2 || .5 || .1 || 2.2
|-
| align="left" | 1986–87
| align="left" | Washington
| 63 || 0 || 20.7 || .407 || .275 || .847 || 2.0 || 3.9 || 1.3 || .1 || 7.2
|-
| align="left" | 1987–88
| align="left" | Denver
| 82 || 75 || 33.9 || .449 || .367 || .834 || 2.7 || 6.1 || 2.0 || .2 || 13.9
|-
| align="left" | 1988–89
| align="left" | Denver
| 77 || 77 || 36.2 || .433 || .356 || .819 || 3.7 || 6.4 || 2.2 || .1 || 18.5
|-
| align="left" | 1989–90
| align="left" | Denver
| 79 || 74 || 34.1 || .402 || .366 || .850 || 2.8 || 6.3 || 1.5 || .0 || 15.5
|-
| align="left" | 1990–91
| align="left" | Denver
| 66 || 66 || 35.5 || .394 || .296 || .879 || 3.9 || 10.5 || 2.2 || .1 || 26.5
|-
| align="left" | 1991–92
| align="left" | Washington
| 78 || 78 || 35.8 || .393 || .324 || .869 || 4.0 || 7.6 || 1.9 || .1 || 18.1
|-
| align="left" | 1992–93
| align="left" | Washington
| 70 || 70 || 35.7 || .439 || .321 || .856 || 3.4 || 7.5 || 1.4 || .1 || 14.8
|-
| align="left" | 1993–94
| align="left" | Washington
| 70 || 67 || 33.4 || .408 || .288 || .830 || 2.6 || 6.9 || 1.4 || .1 || 12.1
|-
| align="left" | 1994–95
| align="left" | Charlotte
| 29 || 0 || 15.3 || .453 || .358 || .833 || 1.0 || 3.3 || .8 || .0 || 6.5
|-
| align="left" | 1995–96
| align="left" | Charlotte
| 21 || 3 || 15.7 || .446 || .341 || .743 || 1.0 || 3.2 || 1.0 || .2 || 5.4
|- class="sortbottom"
| style="text-align:center;" colspan="2"| Career
| 653 || 510 || 31.3 || .415 || .332 || .849 || 2.9 || 6.4 || 1.7 || .1 || 14.7

Playoffs

|-
| align="left" | 1987
| align="left" | Washington
| 3 || – || 27.3 || .320 || .222 || .333 || 2.3 || 3.3 || 2.3 || .0 || 6.3
|-
| align="left" | 1988
| align="left" | Denver
| 11 || – || 36.9 || .362 || .315 || .878 || 3.3 || 5.8 || 1.6 || .2 || 13.4
|-
| align="left" | 1989
| align="left" | Denver
| 2 || – || 37.5 || .417 || .455 || .875 || 8.5 || 4.5 || 1.5 || .0 || 23.5
|-
| align="left" | 1990
| align="left" | Denver
| 3 || – || 35.0 || .382 || .300 || .875 || 2.0 || 6.0 || 1.3 || .0 || 13.0
|-
| align="left" | 1995
| align="left" | Charlotte
| 1 || 0 || 11.0 || .400 || .000 || .000 || 1.0 || 2.0 || .0 || .0 || 4.0
|- class="sortbottom"
| style="text-align:center;" colspan="2"| Career
| 20 || – || 34.0 || .370 || .327 || .850 || 3.4 || 5.2 || 1.6 || .1 || 12.8

Head coaching record

WNBA

|-
| align="left" |WAS
| align="left" |
|34||17||17|||| align="center" |4th in East||3||1||2||
| align="center" |Lost in Conference Semifinals
|-class="sortbottom"
| align="left" |Career
| ||17||17||17|||| ||3||1||2||||

See also
List of National Basketball Association players with 9 or more steals in a game

References

External links
 Career Statistics

1963 births
Living people
20th-century African-American sportspeople
21st-century African-American sportspeople
American expatriate basketball people in Canada
African-American basketball players
American women's basketball coaches
Basketball coaches from Connecticut
Basketball players from Hartford, Connecticut
Bay State Bombardiers players
Boston College Eagles men's basketball players
Charlotte Hornets players
Denver Nuggets players
Memphis Grizzlies assistant coaches
National Basketball Association All-Stars
Point guards
Sacramento Kings draft picks
Sacramento Kings players
United States Basketball League players
Vancouver Grizzlies assistant coaches
Washington Bullets players
Washington Mystics head coaches